Hopewell is an unincorporated community in Boone County, Arkansas, United States.

References

Unincorporated communities in Boone County, Arkansas
Unincorporated communities in Arkansas